Lee Sung-jae (born September 16, 1987) is a South Korea football player who currently plays for Goyang Hi FC.

External links
 
Lee Sung-jae at gyhifc.com

1987 births
Living people
Association football forwards
South Korean footballers
Pohang Steelers players
Incheon United FC players
Gimcheon Sangmu FC players
Suwon FC players
K League 1 players
K League 2 players
Goyang Zaicro FC players